Badgingarra is a small town in the Wheatbelt region of Western Australia, about  north of Perth in the Shire of Dandaragan. It lies on the Brand Highway adjacent to the Badgingarra National Park.

History
The town was gazetted in 1955 and takes its name from nearby Badgingarra Pool. "Badgingarra" is a Noongar word said to mean "water by the manna gums".

The district was originally surveyed in the 1880s; however, due to the widespread presence of poisonous plants in the area and non-conducive soil types, the land was not developed for agriculture. Little settlement occurred until the 1950s, when the use of trace elements such as zinc and copper in fertilisers allowed for farming to occur on the sandy soils around Badgingarra.

In 1955, sufficient population growth had occurred for the gazettal of a townsite to support the settlers. In 1959, the state government established the Badgingarra Research Station, to assist farmers in the development of their enterprises. In 1965, a primary school was established, initially operated in the community hall before a new school was built and opened in 1968.

Commercial area
Today, Badgingarra contains a primary school, tavern and post office, roadhouse and other businesses. It has several recreational facilities at its Community Centre, including tennis courts, a bowling green, a football oval, a golf course, parks and playgrounds.

Natural disasters
At least 1,700 head of cattle were lost along with sheep, crops, a sandalwood plantation and fences.

The town was lashed by storms in 2012, receiving  of rain in less than an hour, accompanied by driving winds and a large amount of hail, which destroyed crops.

Climate

Notes

References

External links

Towns in Western Australia
Shire of Dandaragan